Victor Charles Barney (3 April 1922 – 26 May 2006) was an English professional footballer who played as an inside forward.

Barney was an infantryman in the British Army during the Second World War. While in Italy, he was charged with the renovation of the Stadio Arturo Collana and played for Napoli.

References

1922 births
2006 deaths
Footballers from Stepney
English footballers
Association football inside forwards
Oxford City F.C. players
S.S.C. Napoli players
Reading F.C. players
Bristol City F.C. players
Grimsby Town F.C. players
Oxford United F.C. players
Guildford City F.C. players
English Football League players
British Army personnel of World War II
British expatriates in Italy